Jørgen Jacobsen (14 October 1933 – 26 August 2010) was a Danish footballer. He played in three matches for the Denmark national football team from 1954 to 1955.

References

External links
 

1933 births
2010 deaths
Danish men's footballers
Denmark international footballers
Place of birth missing
Association footballers not categorized by position